ONIC Philippines (abbreviated as ONIC PH) is a Filipino esports team that participates in the MPL-PH since Season 4. Formerly, known as Dream High Gaming.

Mobile Legends: Bang bang

MPL Philippines

Season 4 
Previously known as Dream High Gaming, Onic PH's lineup included OhMyV33nus, Wise, RR Esports, Greed, Dlar, and Zico. RR Esports subsequently left, and Iy4knu took his place. Later, Dream High Gaming competed in the MPL-PH S4 Qualifiers, where they defeated Akosi Dogie's Rumble Royale. After acquiring Dream High Gaming's squad, ONIC Esports ID renamed as Onic PH, despite a newcomer team, is actually a monster in the league, destroying every team that they encountered, with Sunsparks the only team that can stop them back then. ONIC PH later finished 2nd place in the Regular Season, behind SunSparks.

Season 5 

Despite losing to Bren Esports and SunSparks during the regular season, the team subsequently swapped Greed for Fuzaken, and everyone anticipated them to finally win the championship. Despite being dropped to the Lower Bracket during the playoffs, they were able to advance to the Grand Finals by defeating Bren Esports. SunSparks defeats them once more, this time by a score of 3–1.

Season 6 
They were able to get Basic from ULVL when Fuzaken departed the squad (now BNK Blu Fire). Despite the fact that he was acquired, this is Onic's worst season to date. Bren defeats them twice, the first time 2-1 and the second time 2–0. They're also defeated by teams they've beaten in prior seasons, such as Blacklist International and Execration. They ended in a disappointing fourth place, losing to Execration in a "reverse sweep" by a score of 3–2.

Season 7 
Major changes in the Onic Ph team happen in Season 7 with the exchange of the iconic duo OhmyV33nus and Wise to Blacklist International in return for Kairi "Kairi" Rayosdelsol. They did well in the MPLI, but not as well as they had hoped, losing to Work Auster Force, NXP Solid, and Blacklist International, despite defeating other better teams later in the Regular Season, such as Aura, Execration, and Bren. They were knocked out of the Playoffs early, losing 3–2 to Execration.

Season 8 

After finishing second in Seasons 4 and 5, they settled for a runner-up result in Season 8. The team had a major makeover, with four of the six-man lineup from the previous season returning, including former Laus Playbook players Nowee "Ryota" Macasa and Ian "Beemo" Sergio. They also feature Mico "miicoo" Quitlong, a rookie, and veteran Allen "Greed_" Baloy, who played for Onic in season 4 before moving to Aura PH in season 5. Onic Philippines would eventually rank second overall finishing 9-5 and 21–13 in the standings and would find its way to its third finals appearance and its first final appearance in over 2 seasons. Onic Philippines would eventually lose to the back-to-back titleholders in Blacklist International in 5 games. Onic Philippines first to get slot for the M3 after defeating Smart Omega in the score of  3–0 in favor Onic Ph.

Season 9 

Prior to the beginning of MPL Philippines Season 9, it was announced that the 1st-runner up of the M3 World Championships in ONIC Philippines, would not be adding nor removing players from their current lineup.

A Season-opening game against Blacklist International was set as the first game schedule for the day. ONIC Philippines would finish a 2-1 series win against the reigning defending champions of both MPL Philippines and the Mobile Legends World Championships. ONIC would repeat their dominant role against the complete juggernauts of MPL PH Season 9, giving ECHO Philippines its first series lost in a 2-1 series game.

M3 World Championship 
After finishing second in MPL Philippines Season 8, they would still be the second representative of the Philippines in the M3 World Competition alongside Blacklist International. During the Group Draws, ONIC Philippines would be grouped alongside Indonesia's MPL Champion ONIC Esports, MPL Malaysia Runner-Up TODAK and MPL Brazil Runner-Up KEYD.

After the Group A Matches during the first day, ONIC Philippines would match up first with ONIC Esports of Indonesia. Despite a strong early game control over the game, ONIC Esports would rebound and take the victory by a great comeback (0-1). ONIC Esports would then match-up with Malaysia's TODAK that defeated ONIC Esports during their first matchup, but would fall short to ONIC Philippines (1-1). ONIC Philippines would as well finish strong during the second day, taking a win against Brazil's KEYD (2-1), putting them in the First Seed of Group B, followed by TODAK (2-1), KEYD and ONIC Esports (1-2), securing ONIC the first seed in Group B.

ONIC Philippines got 3–0 sweep against the Singapore runner-up team RSG they snatch the two victories using the Dlarskie hero Uranus and on the last game an epic comeback with Kairi's Natan matching maniac kill.

After ONIC Philippines' sweep victory against RSG Singapore, ONIC Philippines would matchup against RRQ Hoshi, the MPL Indonesia Season 8 Runner-Up. This began as well a talk-and-debate on who was the better Jungler in Kairi or Alberttt of RRQ. ONIC Philippines swept RRQ Hoshi in a 3-0 fashion and will be facing off the winner in Match 16.

They are the one first finalist in the MLBB M3 World Championship after the defeat of the North  American team BloodThirsty Kings (BTK), Hatred's Pharsa leads the team to victory after scoring the five kills and assist. After the successful elimination of EVOS SG and the redemption on the BTK, the all Filipino finals fulfilled leading to ONIC Philippines faced its MPL-PH season 8 rival Blacklist International in the end they end up in 2nd place after the 4–0 defeat in favour of Blacklist International

Season 10 

ONIC Philippines' roster began to fall apart from its MLBB M3 Form, with the release of Coach Yeb and Kairi to ONIC Esports in Indonesia and the slow departure of the other members such as Micophobia, Markyyy, Baloyskie, Dlarskie, and Hatred. With numerous rumors that ONIC Philippines will not compete due to possible buyout of the team in MPL Philippines Season 10, rumors were eventually denied as the organization confirmed that ONIC Philippines will be competing. On July 13, 2022, a new roster was eventually released with the popular "ChooxTV" in the roster poster.

On August 25, 2022  ONIC Philippines suddenly announced on their Facebook page about the released of their roster Edgar "ChooxTV" Dumali, currently the team is on the top standing after the 2-1 match against the Smart Omega

Tournament Results

Mobile Legends: Bang Bang

Mobile Legends: Bang Bang World Championships

Mobile Legends: Bang Bang Professional League

Current roster

References 

Esports teams based in the Philippines
Mobile Legends: Bang Bang teams